King Siliwangi or Prabu Siliwangi was a semi-legendary  great king of the Hindu Sunda kingdom prior to the coming of Islam in West Java.

He is a popular character in Pantun Sunda oral tradition, folklores and tales that describe his reign as a glorious era for the Sundanese people. According to tradition he brought his kingdom greatness and prosperity.

The character of King Siliwangi is semi-mythology since in Sundanese oral tradition simply identify the great king of Sunda as "King Siliwangi" regardless the era or historical periods. It is difficult to identify the exact historical character that represented in the legend of King Siliwangi. As the result the tale of this king spanned and vary greatly from the mythical era of Sundanese gods to the coming of Islam in the land of Sunda and the fall of the kingdom.

Several historic Sundanese kings are suggested as the real character inspired the legend of King Siliwangi. The most popular interpretation links King Siliwangi with Sri Baduga Maharaja (said to have reigned 1482–1521).  Another suggestion is that the legend of King Siliwangi might perhaps have been inspired by the history of Niskala Wastu Kancana instead (said to have reigned for 104 years 1371–1475).

Etymology

A linguistical theory suggests that Siliwangi is derived from the Sundanese words of Silih Wangi, meaning a descendant of King Wangi.

According to Kidung Sunda and Carita Parahyangan, King Wangi is identified as King Lingga Buana, a king of Sunda that died at Majapahit in 1357 AD in the Battle of Bubat. Hayam Wuruk, the Majapahit king, intended to marry Dyah Pitaloka Citraresmi, a daughter of King Lingga Buana. The Sunda royal family came to Majapahit to marry the princess to Hayam Wuruk. However, Gajah Mada, prime minister of the Majapahit Empire, saw this event as an opportunity to demand Sunda's submission to Majapahit. He demanded  that the princess not be treated as the queen of Majapahit, but merely as a concubine, as a sign of Sunda's submission. 

Angered by Gajah Mada's insult, the Sunda royal family fought the overwhelming Majapahit forces to the death to defend their honor. After his death, King Lingga Buana was named King Wangi (king with a pleasant fragrance) because of his heroic deed to defend his kingdom's honor.

His descendants with the same quality of greatness were called Silihwangi (successor of Wangi). After the reign of King Wangi (Prebu Maharaja), Kingdom of Sunda saw seven consecutive successor kings, technically all of them are considered as the successor of Wangi (Silihwangi).

Some other historians are of the opinion that Siliwangi is derived from the Sundanese word Asilih Wewangi, meaning changing title.

Legend of King Siliwangi

One of the stories tells about prince Jayadewata, the son of Prabu Anggalarang, king of Galuh, who ruled from Surawisesa Palace in Kawali. Prince Jayadewata also known as Ratu Purana Prebu Guru Dewataprana. 

During his youth the prince was known as Raden Pamanah Rasa (the archer of feelings of love). The name suggests that he was a charming and strikingly handsome young man. People easily fell in love with him. The tradition says he was a  master of literature, music, dance, and the arts, as well as pencak silat martial arts and the princely arts of sword fighting and archery.

An usurper of evil ambition overthrows King Anggalarang and murders him, taking over the throne. The prince Jayadewata is poisoned, drugged, and cast under a black magic spell that caused him to suffer amnesia and insanity. The powerful but insane prince wandered around and caused trouble in many villages, until Ki Gedeng Sindangkasih, the chief of Sindangkasih village, managed to pacifize him. With the love of Nyi Ambetkasih, Ki Gedeng's daughter, the prince is finally cured from his illness. Prince Jayadewata married Nyi Ambetkasih. Later, Prince Jayadewata managed to gain the support of the people and succeeded in reclaiming his rightful throne.

Animal associations

Traditions associated King Siliwangi with the mythical tiger and sometimes the black and white leopard, as his guard. According to legends after the Sultanates of Cirebon and Banten sacked the capital of Pakuan Pajajaran, the king refused to convert to Islam, yet he also refused to fight the invading Muslim forces, since the Sultan of Cirebon was his own kin. Tradition tells that after the fall of Pakuan, the last king of Sunda, accompanied by his faithful followers, retreated to Mount Salak located south of the capital to avoid further bloodshed. Then the king is ngahyang (he disappeared) to become a hyang or spirit. He turned into a mythical beast, the sacred tiger. Tradition mentioned that the King disappeared in Sancang forest, near the southern sea far south in Garut Regency.

By the 17th century, the city of Pakuan Pajajaran has been reclaimed by tropical rainforest, and invested by tiger. The first Dutch expedition into inland West Java was led in 1687 by Pieter Scipio van Oostende. He led his team to explore deep south from Batavia into the remnant of Pakuan and ended on Wijnkoopsbaai (present-day Palabuhanratu). One of the members of his expedition team was mauled by a tiger in the area, two days earlier. Scipio learned from Lieutenant Tanuwijaya's men from Sumedang that the ruins were the remnants of Pakuan or Pajajaran kingdom. 

On 23 December 1687, Governor-General Joanes Camphuijs wrote a report; "that the hilted palace and the special exalted silver tablets of the Javanese King of Pajajaran, guarded by a large number of tigers." The report on the tiger sightings also comes from the residents of Kedung Halang and Parung Angsana who accompanied Scipio on this expedition. Perhaps this was the source of the popular beliefs that the Pajajaran king, nobles and guards were  transformed into mythical tigers.

Possible historic characters
The compiled legends of King Siliwangi do not always correspond with historical facts and records, since some events are vague and do not correspond to the lifetime of the historic Sri Baduga Maharaja. For example, the fall of Pajajaran occur in later times, during the reign of later Sunda kings, the great-great grandson of Sri Baduga. Some legends seem to simply identify the series of last Sunda kings as Siliwangi. However these legends try to explain the historical events of the Sunda kingdom and its relationship with the Sultanates of Cirebon and Banten.

Niskala Wastu Kancana
The legend of King Siliwangi has been around and popularly known in Sundanese oral tradition of Carita Pantun as early as 1518 CE. It was the era of King Jayadewata's reign. Ayatrohaedi, a Sundanese historian argued that it took years for a historical character to gain a revered legendary status, featured in tales and folklores. Thus, it is highly unlikely for a living and ruling character, like Jayadewata, to be revered as such in circulating pantun poetic verses. He suggested that the real historic character should be the predecessor of Jayadewata, and pointed out that King Niskala Wastu Kancana was most likely the real historic character behind the legend of King Siliwangi.
 
By the earliest time the legend of King Siliwangi appear, Niskala Wastu Kancana had been dead for about 40 years. So it is reasonable that the cult or veneration of this late king had appeared by this time. In Sundanese ancient tradition of Hinduism mixed with native ancestral worship, a dead ancestor of great character is believed to have gained a god-like power in the afterlife, and even might be invoked to protect, lend help and interfere with their descendant's affairs.

Niskala Wastu Kancana ruled for 104 years, between 1371 and 1475. His reign is remembered as a long era of peace and prosperity. It is possible that his long lasting reign were fondly remembered by his people as a golden age, thus started a cult or veneration years after his death, and inspired the pantun poetic verses.

Ningrat Kancana
According to Purwaka Caruban Nagari, the chronicle of Cirebon, the Sunda King Siliwangi married to Nyai Subang Larang, daughter of Ki Gedeng Tapa, port master of Muara Jati, which corresponds with the port of Cirebon. They had three children; Prince Walangsungsang born in 1423, Princess Rara Santang born in 1426, and Prince Kian Santang (Raden Sangara) born in 1428. 

Although Prince Walangsungsang was the first-born son of Sunda King, the prince did not earn the right as a crown prince of Sunda Kingdom. This was because his mother, Nyai Subang Larang was not the prameswari (queen consort). Another reason was probably because of his conversion to Islam, probably influenced by his mother, Subang Larang whom was a Muslim woman. In 16th century West Java, Sunda Wiwitan (Sundanese ancestral religion), and Buddhism. It was his half brother, King Siliwangi's son from his third wife Nyai Cantring Manikmayang, who was chosen as crown prince.

Ningrat Kancana is also known as Prabu Dewa Niskala. The character described in Cirebon Chronicle Purwaka Caruban Nagari, as King Siliwangi, both timeline and storyline, matched the historic character of Dewa Niskala or Ningrat Kancana, referred as "Tohaan di Galuh" (Lord of Galuh) in Carita Parahyangan. Tohaan di Galuh was the son and heir of Niskala Wastu Kancana. Ningrat Kancana however, reigned for only seven years and subsequently demoted. Carita Parahyangan tell that "... kena salah twa(h) bogo(h) ka estri larangan ti kaluaran ..," which translate as "because (his) wrongdoing, fell in love with a forbidden outsider woman." The term "outsider woman" is interesting and has led to various proposition; could it be the new king fell in love with a foreigner, outsider, non-Sundanese 
(possibly Javanese), or even non-Hindu (Muslim) woman. It is possible that the outsider forbidden woman mentioned here was Nyai Subang Larang, a Muslim woman daughter of port master of Muara Jati (Cirebon).

Sri Baduga Maharaja
Some historians suggest that this legendary King can be identified with an actual historical figure Sri Baduga Maharaja or King Jayadewata, as mentioned in Batutulis inscription, he is the son of Rahyang Niskala and the grandson of Rahyang Niskala Wastu Kancana. Indeed, King Jayadewata is the most widely believed as the real historical character behind the legend of King Siliwangi. In pantun oral tradition, King Siliwangi often referred as Raden Pamanah Rasa or Ratu Jayadewata, which is the other name of Sri Baduga Maharaja.

One of the Pantun legends tells vividly about a beautiful royal procession of queen Ambetkasih and her courtiers moving to the new capital of Pakuan Pajajaran, where her husband, King Siliwangi awaits. The character described as King Siliwangi in this verse matched perfectly with the real historic person of King Jayadewata, since he was the king that moved the capital city from Kawali to Pakuan Pajajaran in 1482.

Nilakendra
Another popular tale of King Siliwangi, is suggesting that he was the last king of Sunda Kingdom. Tradition tells that after the fall of Pakuan, the last king of Sunda, accompanied by a few of his faithful followers, retreated into highland wilderness of Mount Salak located south of the capital to avoid further bloodshed. It was said that the king retreated instead, to avoid fighting his own kin, since the invading forces of Sultanate Banten and Cirebon were actually his extended relatives. Then the king is ngahyang (he disappeared) to become a hyang or spirit. He turned into a mythical beast, the sacred tiger.

The King Siliwangi mentioned in this tale, matched the real historic character of King Nilakendra or Tohaan di Majaya of Pakuan. It was during his reign that Sunda capital of Dayeuh Pakuan Pajajaran were captured by Sultan Hasanuddin of Banten. Around 1550s Hasanuddin, sultan of Banten has launched a successful attack to Dayeuh Pakuan, captured and razed the capital. The surviving Sunda royalties, nobles and common people fled the fallen city, heading to mountainous wilderness. To disable the authority of Sunda royal institution, Sultan of Banten seize the sacred stone of Palangka Sriman Sriwacana, and took it as a prized plunder to his capital, the port city of Banten. According to tradition, this sacred stone slab is an essential requirement for enthronement ceremony, thus disabling the surviving house of Sunda royals to properly crowned their new king.

Legacy
Through the transmission Pantun Sunda oral tradition, the Sri Baduga's reign is remembered as the peaceful and prosperous golden age in Sundanese history, as the cultural identity and the source of pride for Sundanese people. The kings of Sultanate of Cirebon still trace their ancestry to Sundanese King Siliwangi, it was probably served as the source of legitimacy of their reign in West Java. The TNI Siliwangi Military Division and Siliwangi Stadium was named after King Siliwangi, the eponymous popular king of Sunda corresponded to Sri Baduga Maharaja. His name is honored as the name of West Java province museum, Sri Baduga Museum in Bandung. Balinese Hindus built a candi shrine dedicated to King Siliwangi in the Hindu temple Pura Parahyangan Agung Jagatkarta, Bogor.

See also
 Sunda Kingdom
Siliwangi Division

Notes

References
Atja (1968), Tjarita Parahijangan: Titilar Karuhun Urang Sunda Abad Ka-16 Masehi. Bandung: Jajasan Kebudajaan Nusalarang.
Berg, C.C., (1938), "Javaansche Geschiedschrijving" dalam F.W. Stapel (ed.,) Geschiedenis van Nederlandsch Indie. Jilid II:7-48. Amsterdam. Diterjemahkan oleh S.Gunawan (1974), Penulisan Sejarah Jawa, Jakarta: Bhratara.
Brandes, J.L.A., (1911) "Babad Tjerbon" Uitvoerige inhouds-opgave en Noten door Wijlen Dr.J.L.A.Brandes met inleiding en tekst, uitgegeven door Dr.DA.Rinkes. VBG. LIX. Tweede Druk. Albrecht & Co. -'sGravenhage.
Djoko Soekiman (1982), Keris Sejarah dan Funsinya. Depdikbud-BP3K Yogyakarta. Proyek Javanologi.
Girardet, Nikolaus et al. (1983),Descriptive Catalogue of the Javanese Manuscripts. Wiesbaden: Franz Steiner Verlag.
Graaf, H.J. (1953), Over het Onstaant de Javaanse Rijkskroniek. Leiden.
Olthof, W.L. ed., (1941), Poenika Serat Babad Tanah Djawi Wiwit Saking Adam Doemoegi ing Taoen 1647. 'Gravenhage.
Padmasusastra, Ki (1902), Sajarah Karaton Surakarta-Ngayogyak arta. Semarang-Surabaya: Van Dorp.
Pigeaud, Th. G.Th., (1967–1980), Literature of Java, 4 Jilid. The Hague: Martinus Nijhoff.
Pradjasujitna, R.Ng., (1956), Tjatatan Ringkas Karaton Surakarta. Cetakan Ketiga. Sala: Tigalima.
Ricklefts, M.C dan p. Voorhoeve (1977), Indonesian Manuscripts in Great Britain, Oxford university Press.
Sartono Kartodirdjo et al., (1975), Sejarah Nasional Indonesia II. Departemen Pendidikan dan Kebudayaan. Jakarta. PN Balai Pustaka.
Sumodiningrat Mr.B.P.H., (1983), Pamor Keris. depdiknud BP3K. Yogyakarta: Proyek Javanologi.

Indonesian Hindu monarchs
Folklore characters
Sunda Kingdom
Sundanese folklore
Indonesian Hindus
Sundanese people